RTP may refer to:

Organisations
 Rádio e Televisão de Portugal, the Portuguese public broadcasting corporation
 Royal Thai Police, the national police force of Thailand
 RacingThePlanet, an organizer of endurance foot-races
 Rally of the Togolese People, a former political party in Togo

Science and technology
 Radiation treatment planning, in radiotherapy
 Reinforced thermoplastic pipe, a high pressure pipe
 Rapid thermal processing, in semiconductor production
 Round-the-pole flying, of model aircraft

Computing
 Real-time Transport Protocol, for delivering audio and video over IP networks
 Reliable Transport Protocol, a Cisco protocol used by Enhanced Interior Gateway Routing Protocol
 Rendezvous and Termination Protocol, part of the PARC internetwork protocol suite

Other uses
 Recreational Trails Program, in the United States
 Red de Transporte de Pasajeros, in Mexico City, Mexico
 Regional Transportation Plan, in the United States
 Registered Teacher Programme, in England and Wales
 Research Triangle Park, North Carolina, United States
 Reserve Tranche Position, with the International Monetary Fund 
 Ragam Thanam Pallavi, a kind of Carnatic music performance

See also
 RTMP (disambiguation)